Duli Yang Maha Mulia (Jawi script: دولي يڠ مها موليا) is the title of the state anthem of Selangor, Malaysia, adopted in 1967. The lyricist is unknown, but the music was written by Saiful Bahri, who also wrote and composed the Malaccan state anthem, Melaka Maju Jaya.

The phrase is also the royal title, equivalent to "His Royal Highness", used to refer to state rulers in Malaysia. This royal title is used especially on the heads of states of Negeri Sembilan, Selangor, Perlis, Terengganu, Kedah, Kelantan, Pahang, Johor, and Perak.

History 
The first state anthem of Selangor was composed in 1908, a re-interpretation of the folk song Chantek Manis by Daniel Ortego. The lyrics to that are as follows:

Allah selamatkan Duli Yang Maha Mulia,
Kekal dan selamat di-atas Takhta,
Panjangkan umur dan aman sentosa,
Adil mewah murah memerintah rata,
Daulat!

In 1967, Sultan Salahuddin Abdul Aziz Shah, the-then Sultan of Selangor, announced that the song would be replaced with the present anthem.

Lyrics

References

Notes

External links

Selangor
Anthems of Malaysia
Titles of national or ethnic leadership
Royal styles